These are the results of the women's individual all-around competition, one of six events for female competitors in the artistic gymnastics discipline contested in the gymnastics at the 2004 Summer Olympics in Athens. The qualification and final rounds took place on August 15 and August 19 at the Olympic Indoor Hall.

Results

Qualification

Ninety-eight gymnasts qualified to compete in the individual all-around event in the artistic gymnastics qualification round on August 15, by performing on at least one apparatus.
The twenty-four highest scoring gymnasts advanced to the final on August 19.

Final

Remaining placings

References

External links
Gymnastics Results.com

Women's artistic individual all-around
2004
2004 in women's gymnastics
Women's events at the 2004 Summer Olympics